Eriosema harmsiana is a species of legume in the family Fabaceae that is endemic to Namibia.

References

Phaseoleae
Flora of Namibia
Least concern plants
Taxonomy articles created by Polbot